Raphidovirus (likely misspelled Rhaphidovirus) is a genus of viruses, in the family Phycodnaviridae. Alga serve as natural hosts. There is only one species in this genus: Heterosigma akashiwo virus 01 (HaV01).

Structure

Viruses in Raphidovirus are enveloped, with icosahedral and round geometries, and T=169 symmetry. The diameter is around 100-220 nm. Genomes are linear, around 295kb in length.

Life cycle
Viral replication is nucleo-cytoplasmic. Replication follows the DNA strand displacement model. DNA-templated transcription is the method of transcription. The virus exits the host cell by lysis via lytic phospholipids. Alga serve as the natural host. Transmission routes are passive diffusion.

References

External links
 Viralzone: Raphidovirus
 ICTV

Phycodnaviridae
Virus genera